Bailey is an unincorporated community and U.S. Post Office in northeastern Park County, Colorado, United States.  Bailey's Post Office ZIP Code is 80421.

The town community consists of several small businesses, restaurants and churches.

The North Fork South Platte River flows through Bailey.

History 
William Bailey settled a ranch and built a stage station known as Bailey's Ranch in 1864.  Bailey also built a hotel at the station, and the town eventually became known as Bailey.  The Denver & South Park Railroad reached Bailey in 1878, and the Bailey Post Office opened on November 20, 1878.

On March 18, 2006, the Coney Island Hot Dog Stand, a landmark building shaped like a giant hot dog was moved from Aspen Park to Bailey.

On September 27, 2006, a hostage crisis occurred after a lone gunman took seven female students hostage at a classroom in Platte Canyon High School and  sexually assaulted them before opening fire after a SWAT team breached the room. One hostage was killed, while the remaining escaped uninjured. The hostage-taker then committed suicide after being shot by police.

On February 24, 2016, three Park County Sheriffs were shot, one fatally. these officers were serving an eviction to a known disgruntled man in the house.

The rustic Glen-Isle Resort in Bailey, as well as the Estabrook Historic District northeast of Bailey, are both listed on the National Register of Historic Places.

Geography 
Bailey is located in the foothills of the Front Range, approximately 30 miles (48 km) southwest of Denver along U.S. Highway 285. It is located on the east side of Kenosha Pass and is one of the largest communities in the Platte Canyon region.

Climate
Bailey has a humid continental climate (Dfb) with cold winters and warm summers.

Arts and culture

Bailey Day street festival is an annual summer event in the city, featuring bands, vendors and family activities.

The Bailey HUNDO is a 100-mile endurance mountain bike race that begins and ends in Bailey.  It has been an annual event since 2009, and money raised is invested in the construction of new bike trails and in youth biking initiatives in Colorado.  Both the Buffalo Creek Trail System and the Colorado Trail are easily accessible from Bailey.

Tomahawk Ranch, a residential camp operated by the Girl Scouts of Colorado, is located near Bailey.

In 2004, Bailey was the location for Apogaea, an annual outdoor arts and music festival.

Education
Bailey is served by the Platte Canyon School District #1.

Platte Canyon High School has approximately 300 students.  In sports, they are a 3A school in the Frontier League. The Girls' Cross Country Team was the Colorado State 3A Champion in 1986, and the Girls' Track Team was the Colorado State 3A Champion in 1996 and in 2005, and the Boys' Track Team was the Colorado 3A State Champion in 2008. The Speech and Debate team holds the record for the most individual State Champions at the Festival Level.

Notable people
 Erwin Jay Boydston, recipient of the Medal of Honor, America's highest military award.
 Hal Hickel, Academy Award winning visual effects animator.

In popular culture
Bailey was referenced four times in South Park:
Season 06, episode 13, parodying The Lord of the Rings
Season 09, episode 14, "Bloody Mary" at ~10:09 {"...St. Peters Church in Bailey..."}
Season 12, episode 02, "Britney's New Look" at ~02:22 {"...photograph was taken by Brian Willis of Bailey, Colorado..."}
Season 23, episode 03, "SHOTS!!!"
While not mentioned by name, the Coney Island Hot Dog Stand was featured several times in Season 25 Episode 3.

See also

The High Timber Times
Outline of Colorado
Index of Colorado-related articles
State of Colorado
Colorado cities and towns
Colorado counties
Park County, Colorado
Colorado metropolitan areas
Front Range Urban Corridor
North Central Colorado Urban Area
Denver-Aurora-Boulder, CO Combined Statistical Area
Denver-Aurora-Broomfield, CO Metropolitan Statistical Area

References

External links

 Platte Canyon Area Chamber of Commerce

Unincorporated communities in Park County, Colorado
Unincorporated communities in Colorado
Denver metropolitan area